The British Rail Class 104 diesel multiple units were built by Birmingham Railway Carriage and Wagon Company from 1957 to 1959.

A product of British Rail's Modernisation Plan of 1954, the 104s were designed for general branch line and commuter routes. The first units ordered were for the London Midland Region, with the majority of the class for use in North West of England. The Class 110 was a re-engineered version of the 104 with more powerful engines, but did not last as long in service. The 104s had asbestos insulation removed during the 1970s.

Operations

Greater Manchester
The 104 was introduced on 17 June, 1957. The type was seen regularly on services from Manchester to Buxton, Marple, New Mills and Blackpool. The 104 was ideal for these routes as the lightweight chassis were well suited to the hilly lines in the northwest of England. A regular sight in the Greater Manchester area for over 30 years, the 104s were replaced by Sprinters by 1990, with the last running on 4 May 1990.

Scotland
In early 1984 a few units reallocated to Scotland to replace Class 107s. A fire at Ayr depot had destroyed several trains and the 104s were called in to replace them. One unit was repainted in a unique maroon and white livery for services to Oban – it became known as the "Mexican Bean". The 104s were withdrawn from Scotland in April 1989 and were replaced by Sprinter DMUs.

London Region
Other vehicles spent time in London and the last vehicles could be found on the Gospel Oak to Barking Line. They were withdrawn in 1995.

Orders

Gallery

Accidents and incidents
On 18 January 1986, a Class 104 unit (vehicles 53433 & 53482) suffered a brake failure, ran past three signals at danger and collided with Class 47 locomotive 47 111 near . Forty-four people were injured.

Departmental Use
A number of Class 104s were used following their withdrawal from passenger services.

The last two London Midland DTCL vehicles to survive, M54182 & M54183, were converted in 1987/1988 into loco hauled Sandite cars and renumbered ADB977554/ADB977555 respectively. Used until 1994, M54183 was scrapped in February 1994 while M54182 was stored at Buxton until June 2000 and was saved for preservation.

Other Sandite cars included 53472, 53478 & 53530 which were used in Scotland until April 1989.

Derby RTC, known for their railway testing, used 53475, 53506 & 53422 (renumbered 977342, 977343 & 977344 respectively) as carriage washing test coaches. They also used 53451 & 53529 as part of DMU auto-gear experiments until February 1991.

M54182 was the only vehicle converted for non-passenger use to survive into preservation. In 2008 after several years in storage, the vehicle was restored externally, retaining its departmental condition and run in a demonstration capacity with Class 37 37075 for a gala weekend at the Churnet Valley Railway. It was believed by the organisers to be the first and only time that departmental DMU Sandite operations had been recreated in a heritage setting.

Preservation
13 Class 104 vehicles are preserved, all were owned privately by two individuals. 12 vehicles were preserved in 1992 in a bulk tender from British Rail who at the time were reluctant to sell individual vehicles or sets. The thirteenth was saved in 2000 after protracted storage after departmental use. In 2020 the first one was scrapped (50556) due to its extremely poor condition at the East Lancashire Railway.

East Lancs Railway
The East Lancs Railway is now the main location for Class 104 preservation, with a number of vehicles based there. The line is geographically appropriate to the Class, being close to Manchester, and lines that the Class 104's served for most of their lives. During their time at the Churnet Valley Railway a small restoration team returned a 2-car set to service between 1997 & 2004. Between 2005 & 2010 attention turned to the rebuild of unique Trailer Composite Lavatory (TCL) M59137 to strengthen the 2-car set to 3 cars, however limited resources put the restoration on hold. Driving Trailer Composite Lavatory (DTCL) ADB977554 was also cosmetically restored into BR Blue livery in 2008 and performed demonstration sandite trains that year with Class 37 Diesel 37075.

Llangollen Railway
The Llangollen Railway received three vehicles in 1994 on a long-term loan basis. A 2-car set (M50454/M50528) was quickly returned to service in 1994 and has operated in service every season bar one since. The railway also have a "spare" power car (M50447) which was used as a mess-coach and workshop between 1994 & 2011 before being selected itself for a restoration to operating condition, which is currently ongoing.

North Norfolk Railway
The North Norfolk Railway received DTCL 56182 in February 2015 from the Churnet Valley Railway for restoration back to original condition.  It was then joined by 50479 in October 2020 from the Telford Steam Railway for restoration but is currently stored until 56182 is completed. 50479 will receive a rolling restoration, so it can be used to haul 56182 at special events, of body and interior to bring it up to a fully restored condition. Once restoration of both vehicles are complete they will run in a as delivered 2-car power trailer formation.

Telford Steam Railway
The Telford Steam Railway was home to the remaining four vehicles (also on long-term loan), which arrived between 1999 and 2001 from Oswestry, Crewe and Meadowhall. Between 1999 & 2004 the railway operated a 2-car set formed of M50479/M50531 but it was later downgraded to coaching stock use only and by 2010 only M50479 was used. Then in 2018 M50479 was finally withdraw and stored. The other two vehicles, E59228 & E53556, are in poor condition and have not run in preservation. E53556 left for the East Lanchshire Railway in November 2017 to be scrapped. M50479 left in October 2020 for the North Norfolk Railway after the loan was terminated. It will be restored after M56182. E59228 left in October 2020 for the East Lancashire Railway where it will be stored for the foreseeable future after the loan terminated in 2017.

References

External links

Llangollen Railcar Group - owners of preserved DMUs on Llangollen Railway.
The Birmingham Railcar Workgroup
The Railcar Association
Telford Steam Railway

104
BRCW multiple units
Train-related introductions in 1957